Gwinnett Place Mall is a largely vacant shopping mall located in the Pleasant Hill Road corridor of Duluth, Georgia, in the United States. Once the leading mall in the region, the mall centrered on one of the fastest-growing counties in the nation, until the openings of Mall of Georgia in Buford and Sugarloaf Mills in Lawrenceville. It was used as the Starcourt Mall filming location for the third season of Netflix's Stranger Things.

History

Original anchor tenants upon opening in 1984 were Rich's, Davison's and Sears. Mervyn's later joined the mall, and Davison's was changed to Macy's. Parisian then joined the mall anchoring a northwest wing. J. C. Penney took over the Mervyn's place in 1984 and closed in later that year after a mall fire, with Beauty Master taking over in 2016. Macy's and Rich's merged in 2003 to form Rich's-Macy's until 2005 when the name was changed to Macy's. With two Macy's in the mall, the former Davison's closed and in 2010 reopened as the first MegaMart in the U.S. In 2007, Parisian was renamed Belk, which closed in 2013.

The mall was challenged by the openings of the Mall of Georgia in 1999 and Sugarloaf Mills in 2001, and lost a large part of its customer base.  The mall was also to attract any new anchors for several years. In 2008, Gwinnett Technical College opened an International Education Center in the mall, where students take foreign language classes. Many of the mall's store fronts and food court vendors are empty and up for lease. The downturn of the mall in 2013 led to the closure of Belk as well as Simon Property Group to lose the mall to foreclosure, where it was acquired by Moonbeam Capital Investments LLC. JCPenney would close on April 4, 2015 and Beauty Master purchased the former JCPenney building in March 2016. Beauty Master would open on August 4, 2016. 

In December 2017 the body of a 19-year-old woman was found in the back room of the food court, where it had gone unnoticed for weeks. In January 2018, two mall employees were robbed and assaulted in the Macy's parking lot, and in March 2018, a 32-year-old female was arrested for indecent exposure, solicitation of prostitution, and possession of heroin and cocaine in the Sears parking lot. On May 31, 2018, Sears announced that their location there would be closing in September 2018 as part of a plan to close 63 stores across the United States.

In late February 2019, The Atlanta Journal-Constitution and Gwinnett Daily Post reported that sports developer CricRealty intends to redevelop the Gwinnett Place Mall site to build a mixed-use development anchored by a 20,000-seat cricket stadium.

On December 15, 2020, officials from Gwinnett County's Urban Redevelopment Agency agreed to purchase the 39-acre Gwinnett Place Mall site from Moonbeam Capital Investments LLC for $23 million.  Several tenants, including  Macy’s, Mega Mart and Beauty Master, own their own property.  The sale closed in April 2021 but plans for the site were not disclosed.

In popular culture 
The third season of Stranger Things was filmed in the mall.  Authentic signage and storefronts were returned through a cosmetic restoration of a portion of the Gwinnett Place Mall, to represent many businesses that have since ceased to exist. The transformation took place during May 2018, with production of the series taking place in the mall during the subsequent summer months. After filming concluded, the Starcourt Mall set was dismantled in the summer of 2019 to prevent fans from vandalizing the set to steal souvenirs.

References

External links
Gwinnett Place Mall official website

Shopping malls in the Atlanta metropolitan area
Buildings and structures in Gwinnett County, Georgia
Tourist attractions in Gwinnett County, Georgia
shopping malls disestablished in 2020
Defunct shopping malls in the United States
Shopping malls established in 1984